The  is the law that governs electrical appliance safety in Japan. PSE stands for Product Safety Electrical Appliance & Material. The most recent revision comes April 1, 2001. The PSE symbol can be found on appliances that are approved for use in Japan.

DENAN is a mandatory national law administered by Japan's Ministry of Economy, Trade and Industry (METI), which was formerly called the Electrical Appliance and Material Control Law (“DENTORI”). For electrical appliances such as DC Power Supplies exported to Japan, the DENAN “DENAN symbol” approval is required.

AC/DC power supplies are considered a "Category A" product with means they are specified products and require a diamond PSE Mark for use in Japan. These specified electrical appliances are either required to undergo third-party conformity assessment, and obtain their certificate, or obtain “the equivalent of a certificate” through the manufacturers of the specified electrical appliances concerned. The Notifying Supplier (importer) is responsible for ensuring that the product is tested in accordance with the requirements by a RCAB (or “Registered Conformity Assessment Body”).

PSE rated power supplies are characterized by classes and ratings ranges rather than specific model numbers.

References

See also
 IEC 60364
 National Electrical Safety Code
 Canadian Electrical Code
 Slash rating
 Central Electricity Authority Regulations

Electrical safety
Safety codes
Japanese legislation
Standards of Japan
2001 establishments in Japan
Symbols introduced in 2001